Labrinth, Sia & Diplo Present... LSD, also known simply as LSD, is the debut studio album by the music group LSD. Originally scheduled to be released by Columbia Records on 2 November 2018, it was pushed back to 12 April 2019.

Background
LSD, consisting of English singer-producer Labrinth, Australian singer-songwriter Sia, and American producer-DJ Diplo, was teased on 11 March 2018 by Diplo after he posted a picture of a cassette with the logo of LSD on his Instagram. 5 singles were released prior to the release, as well as a remix of Genius, featuring Lil Wayne.

Physical release

The album was released on CD, and a Japanese edition was released containing four bonus remixes. On 28 June 2019, a limited edition coloured vinyl was released.

Singles
"Genius" was released on 3 May 2018 as the album's lead single. It impacted alternative radio in the US on 19 June 2018, and is featured on the video game by EA Sports, FIFA 19.

"Audio" served as the second single off of the album. It was released on 10 May 2018 and impacted contemporary hit radio in the US on 26 June 2018.

The third single, "Thunderclouds", was released on 9 August 2018. It was used as the main theme song for the Samsung Galaxy Note 9 promotional campaign, being featured extensively in parts in the company's ads, as well as at the reveal event in New York on 9 August 2018. The single is their most successful to date, having garnered over 330 million streams on Spotify, as of February 2020.

"Mountains" was released as the fourth single from the album on 1 November 2018. "No New Friends" was made available for download on 14 March 2019. A remix of "Heaven Can Wait" by The Aston Shuffle was released on 24 May 2019.

Critical reception
LSD received mixed reviews from critics. Kat Bein of Entertainment Weekly wrote that LSD were not afraid to "get weird" on this project and praised the album, noting that its "mix of tropical vibes and experimental hooks give [it] a pleasant, lush, varied landscape of tones and tempos". Writing for Pitchfork, Dani Blum criticised the album, writing that it sounds like "an algorithmic midden of pop music" and that the lyrical content is "asinine". Jem Aswad of Variety noted that there are "several gems" in the album's tracks, and praised Labrinth and Diplo's production. Reviewing for NME, El Hunt gave LSD 3 out of 5 stars, praising "exceptional" stand-out tracks such as "Thunderclouds" and "Genius", but also implying the album is generic, and those desiring more experimental music should "[look] elsewhere". Neil Z. Yeung of AllMusic rated the album 4 out of 5 stars, describing the album as "good and fun", and as an "experience to embrace and enjoy".
The album received a weighted average rating of 60 based on reviews from seven critics on review aggregator Metacritic, indicating "mixed or average" reception.

Commercial performance
The album has accumulated over 1 billion streams on Spotify. It debuted and peaked at number 70 on the US Billboard 200 and 44 on the UK Albums Chart, and has been certified Platinum in Brazil and Gold in Norway.

Track listing
Adapted from iTunes.

Notes
  signifies a co-producer.
  signifies an additional producer.
 "No New Friends" is titled "Know New Friends" on vinyl pressings.

Charts

Weekly charts

Year-end charts

Certifications

See also
 Diplo discography
 Labrinth discography
 Sia discography

References

2019 debut albums
LSD (group) albums
Albums produced by Diplo
Albums produced by Labrinth
Columbia Records albums
Psychedelic pop albums